Overflow may refer to:

Computing and telecommunications
Integer overflow, a condition that occurs when an integer calculation produces a result that is greater than what a given register can store or represent
Buffer overflow, a situation whereby the incoming data size exceeds that which can be accommodated by a buffer.
Heap overflow, a type of buffer overflow that occurs in the heap data area
Overflow (software), a NASA-developed computational fluid dynamics program using overset (Chimera) grids
Overflow condition, a situation that occurs when more information is being transmitted than the hardware can handle
Overspill, a proof technique in non-standard analysis, is less commonly called overflow
Stack overflow in which a computer program makes too many subroutine calls and its call stack runs out of space

Other
Overflow (magazine), a free quarterly in Brooklyn, New York, US
0verflow, a Japanese video game developer
River overflow, a relatively long and significant increase in the water content of a river, causing a rise in its level
Sanitary sewer overflow, a condition whereby untreated sewage is discharged into the environment, escaping wastewater treatment